Mattie William Pollock (born 28 September 2001) is an English professional footballer who plays as a defender for Scottish Premiership club Aberdeen, on loan from Watford.

Pollock was the product of the youth academies of Middlesbrough and Leeds United before joining Grimsby Town's academy in 2018. He later signed full professional terms with Grimsby and went on to make 46 league appearances for the club before signing for Watford in 2021. He has since spent time on loan with Cheltenham Town.

Early life
Born in Redhill, Pollock was brought up in Middlesbrough, where he attended the Nunthorpe Academy.

Career
Pollock was a trainee with Leeds United up until under-15 level, where he was considered a midfielder.

Grimsby Town
Pollock joined Grimsby Town on a scholarship in 2018 after being scouted playing as a defender for his father's team, Polton Allstars. He was called up to the first-team bench by manager Michael Jolley for the first time in October 2018. Pollock made his professional debut on 29 December, coming on as a 52nd-minute substitute for Martyn Woolford in a 2–1 win at Exeter City following a red card for centre-back Alex Whitmore. He turned professional in February 2019 and upon signing a -year deal said that "my ultimate ambition is to be the best central defender in the world and play at the highest level I can". Pollock was given his first start for the "Mariners" on 13 August 2019, in a 1–0 victory over Doncaster Rovers at Blundell Park. He scored his first goal for Grimsby in a 1–1 draw with Carlisle United on 24 October 2020.

Watford
On 27 May 2021, Pollock joined Watford on a five-year deal for an initial fee of £250,000.

On 30 August 2021, Pollock joined Cheltenham Town on loan for the 2021–22 season. Pollock scored his first goal for Cheltenham in the FA Cup first round against Gillingham on 6 November 2021. He also scored in the replay win on 16 November, earning Cheltenham a spot in the second round and praise from manager Michael Duff.

Pollock made his Watford debut on 23 August 2022 in a 2–0 home defeat to MK Dons in the second round of the EFL Cup, and his full Championship debut on 19 October 2022 in a 3–0 away defeat to Millwall. He was loaned to Scottish Premiership club Aberdeen in January 2023.

Personal life
He is the son of former Middlesbrough and Manchester City  midfielder Jamie Pollock, and younger brother to professional footballer Ben Pollock.

Honours
Cheltenham Town
Supporters Young Player of the Season: 2021–22

Career statistics

References

2001 births
Living people
English footballers
Association football defenders
Grimsby Town F.C. players
Watford F.C. players
Cheltenham Town F.C. players
English Football League players
Aberdeen F.C. players